The Pleasure Ridge Park Fire Protection District (abbreviated PRPFD) is one of the fourteen departments that make up the Jefferson County Fire Service.

History
The Pleasure Ridge Park Fire District (PRP) was originally formed by a group of local citizens in February 1950.  For the first six months of PRP's existence it operated on funds provided by local businesses whose names were placed on the back of firefighter turnout gear. In October 1950, PRP was officially recognized as a fire protection district under Kentucky Revised Statute (KRS) Chapter 75 Fire Protection Districts, which enabled it to collect taxes from property owners for its funding.  PRP was initially an all-volunteer force.  The first chief, Edward R. Gland, commanded a group of sixteen volunteers and operated out of a building it shared with the Jefferson County Police Department and the Department of Public Works.
In 1955, PRP constructed its first stand alone fire station at the present site of PRP Station 1.  By the end of the 1950s PRP was operating out of two stand alone fire stations, in the 1960s two more stations were constructed and in the 1970s a fifth station was added.  In 1991, PRP constructed a state-of-the-art training facility that included a 6th fire station.  In 2004, PRP merged with a neighboring department (South Dixie Fire Protection District) which added two more fire stations; this accounts for the eight current facilities operated by PRP.
From 1950 to 1973, PRP remained an all-volunteer force.  In 1973 a radio dispatcher was employed by the district.  In 1975 the first female employee of the district was hired as a fire inspector.  By 1984, PRP was still operating with an all-volunteer firefighting force consisting of 150 members, but had hired 11 employees to manage dispatching, building inspections, apparatus maintenance and hydrant inspections.  In 1987, fire dispatching was transferred to the Louisville Division of Fire and the PRP dispatchers were transferred to PRP's first career fire company making PRP's official department type change from volunteer to combination.
In 1991, PRP hired its first career fire chief, Eric D. Evans.  Also, in the 1990s, PRP added a second career fire company during business hours which with the first career fire company responded to incidents during the day until the large volunteer suppression force was able to staff units after business hours.  In 2003 PRP, following a trend of most departments with career members, moved its career staff from 40-hour employees to 56-hour employees.  In 2004, PRP merged with a neighboring department and added a third career company which was the model until 2018.
In 2018 PRP began providing a Basic and Advanced Life Support ground ambulance service.  On July 1, 2020 Pleasure Ridge Park Fire merged with Lake Dreamland Fire.

Mergers
In 2004, South Dixie Fire District merged with Pleasure Ridge Park Fire Protection District.

In 2020, Lake Dreamland Fire Department merged with Pleasure Ridge Fire Protection District.

Statistics
In 2012, PRPFD was one of 676 registered Fire Departments in the state of Kentucky according to the National Fire Department Census.

In 2019, PRP EMS Unit 2281 Ranked #17 Busiest Ambulance in the United States with 5,000 call for service.

In 2019, PRP Engine 2231 Ranked #97 as the busiest Engine Company in the United States with 3,147 call for service.

Operations
Pleasure Ridge Park Fire Protection District operates out of 6 stations, making it the 7 largest department in the state of Kentucky, behind Lexington and Louisville. Here is a list of stations, their locations, and operating companies.

Station 1 - 4500 Kerrick Lane

Engine 2231 - Career Staffed

Quint 2251 - Reserve

Medic 2281 - Career Staffed

Vehicle/Apparatus Repair Facility

Station 2/Headquarters - 9500 Stonestreet Road

Truck 2252 - Career Staffed

Medic 2282 - Career Staffed

ALS Car 2214 (Medical Supervisor) - Career Staffed

Battalion 2203 - Career Staffed

Forestry 2272

Fire Prevention Bureau

Station 3 - 8505 Terry Road

Engine 2233 - Career Staffed

Quad 2243 - Reserve

Car 2223 (Paramedic Fly-Car) - Career Staffed

Medic 2283 - Career Staffed

Station 4 - 13210 Dixie Hwy

Engine 2234 - Part-Time (Staffed 24/7/365)

Engine 2224 - Reserve

Station 5 - 4603 Cane Run Road

Quad 2245 - Career Staffed

Engine 2235 - Reserve

Medic 2285 - Career Staffed

Haz-Mat 22 (West Side component of Jefferson County Haz-Mat Team)

Station 6 - 4912 Campground Road

Engine 2236 - Rapid Response (Staffed during night hours)

Training Center - 8201 Greenwood Road

Training Facility

Special Operations

Trench Rescue Team
The Trench Rescue Team has members from all fourteen suburban fire districts and Louisville Metro EMS.  Team members are trained to one of three levels of certification under National Fire Protection Association (NFPA) standards.
Technician
Operations
Competent Person

Water Rescue Team
The Jefferson County Water Rescue Team has members from several Suburban Fire Districts. PRPFD being one of those whose Water Rescue Team operates with the use of two inflatable Zodiac boats and two Jet skis which are housed at Station 6. PRPFD has the only rescue boats on the lower pool of the Ohio River from McAlpine Dam to the Salt River (Kentucky). The team is equipped to handle water rescues on rivers, swift water streams, and flooding. Both teams assist in operations during Thunder Over Louisville.
The team was activated by the State Emergency Management Agency and deployed to help in rescue operations in New Orleans, following Hurricane Katrina in August 2005.

HAZMAT Team
Due to this Districts location to many industrial areas namely Riverport and the Rubbertown Chemical Facilities. All Pleasure Ridge Park Firefighters are HAZMAT Operations Level certified and respond to Hazardous Materials Incidents. Pleasure Ridge Park Fire District also has members that are HAZMAT Technician certified that participate with the Jefferson County Hazardous Response Team.

WHAS Crusade for Children
Annual collections for the WHAS Crusade for Children were pioneered by the Pleasure Ridge Park Fire Protection District of which all other Districts have since taken part.
Pleasure Ridge Park was the top contributing Fire District for the 59th annual WHAS Crusade for Children. The citizens of Pleasure Ridge Park donated $314,132.27 in 2012. On June 5, 2016, at the 63rd annual WHAS Crusade for Children Pleasure Ridge Park Fire Protection District was recognized for donating over $8,000,000 to the Crusade, since 1956.

2018 Crusade for Children, Pleasure Ridge Park Fire Collection Total: $189,307.09

2019 Crusade for Children, Pleasure Ridge Park Fire Collection Total: $194,154.54

2020 Crusade for Children, Pleasure Ridge Park Fire Collection total: $77,417.63 (Covid-19 affected this years total)

References

External links
 WHAS Crusade for Children - Official Site
 Jefferson Riverport International - Resident Companies
 Life-Savers Inc.

See also
 Valley Station, Louisville
 Combination fire department
 Pleasure Ridge Park, Louisville

Jefferson County, Kentucky
Fire departments in Kentucky
1950 establishments in Kentucky
Organizations established in 1950
Fire protection districts in the United States